Ye Zhichao (1838-1901) was a Chinese general of the Qing Dynasty who fought in the First Sino-Japanese War, being the commander of Qing forces stationed in Korea. 

An aging veteran of the Nian Rebellion, he sided in November 1891 with Chinese secret society called Jindandao (金丹道), who rose in revolt in Inner Mongolia and massacred 150,000 - 500,000 Mongols. When Li Hongzhang, Governor-General of Chinese Zhili Province, dispatched Ye Zhichao, Commander-in-chief of Zhili, to suppress the rebels, he falsely reporting to the imperial court in Beijing that the Mongol banner army killed innocent Chinese. Prince Vangdudnamjil, the jasagh of the Kharachin Right Banner, who was consulted with by the imperial court, successfully rebutted General Ye's claim with a detailed report 

As commander of the Zhili provincial troops under Li Hongzhang when the Sino-Japanese war broke out in 1894, General Ye initially led the 3,000 Chinese army at Asan, but when they were driven out of the city by the Imperial Japanese Army and he retreated north to Pyongyang. Following the defeat at Pyongyang by the Japanese in September 1894, Ye Zhichao ordered the Chinese defenders to retreat over the Yalu River (which marked the border between China and Korea) into Qing territory. General Ye was sentenced to death for his failures, but managed to avoid being executed due to his guanxi connections. He was also reputed to be an opium addict.

Sources

References

Books 

1838 births
1901 deaths
Chinese military personnel of the First Sino-Japanese War
Qing dynasty generals
Qing dynasty provincial military commanders